Diwan Bahadur Sir Subbarayalu Kumaraswami Reddiar (23 April 1876 - after 1937) was an Indian lawyer and politician who served as a minister in Madras Presidency.

Early life 

Kumaraswami Reddiar was born in Tinnevely on 23 April 1876. He was educated at the Hindu College, Tinnevely and graduated from Presidency College, Madras. He studied law at Madras Law College and practised law. He served as Government Pleader and Public Prosecutor of Tinnevely till September 1926 before joining the Justice Party in the late 1920s.

Politics 

Kumaraswami Reddiar was elected to the Madras Legislative Council on a Justice Party ticket in 1930.

Kumaraswami Reddiar resigned his ministry post due to ill-health in 1936 and he was replaced with Muthiah Chettiar in a move to wipe out differences in the party. The resignation of P.T.Rajan and him lead to the step-down of B. Munuswamy Naidu from the position of Chief Minister and his subsequent succession by his rival Ramakrishna Ranga Rao, who was favoured by zamindars such as Muthiah Chettiar.

He was knighted in the 1937 Coronation Honours list.

Notes

References 

 
 

1876 births
Knights Bachelor
Indian Knights Bachelor
Presidency College, Chennai alumni
19th-century Indian lawyers
Year of death missing
20th-century Indian lawyers
People from Tirunelveli
Lawyers in British India